Bedford Township is a civil township of Monroe County in the U.S. state of Michigan.  As of the 2010 census, the township population was 31,085.

Bedford Township was organized in 1836. Bedford Township is the most-populated municipality in Monroe County and the second most-populated civil township in the state of Michigan after Macomb Township.

Communities
The Lambertville 48144 ZIP Code serves the southwest part of Bedford Township.
 Little Lake is a former community within the township.  It briefly had its own post office from August 11, 1873 until December 30, 1879.  William Tuttle served as the first postmaster.  Tuttle's residence and post office can be seen in section 10 of an 1876 map of Bedford Township. 
The Samaria 48177 ZIP Code provides P.O. Box service for the area.
The Temperance 48182 ZIP Code serves most of Bedford Township outside of the Lambertville area.

Geography

Major highways
 runs briefly along the southeast corner of the township.
 also runs very briefly parallel to US 24 in the southeast corner of the township.
 is a former state highway that ran through the township.  It is now under local control.

Demographics
As of the census of 2000, there were 28,606 people, 10,327 households, and 8,086 families residing in the township. The racial makeup of the township was 97.56% White, 0.40% African American, 0.20% Native American, 0.51% Asian, 0.01% Pacific Islander, 0.41% from other races, and 0.92% from two or more races. Hispanic or Latino of any race were 1.93% of the population.

There were 10,327 households, out of which 38.0% had children under the age of 18 living with them, 66.5% were married couples living together, 8.4% had a female householder with no husband present, and 21.7% were non-families. 18.3% of all households were made up of individuals, and 8.0% had someone living alone who was 65 years of age or older. The average household size was 2.76 and the average family size was 3.15.

In the township the population was spread out, with 28.1% under the age of 18, 6.6% from 18 to 24, 29.2% from 25 to 44, 25.3% from 45 to 64, and 10.9% who were 65 years of age or older. The median age was 38 years. For every 100 females, there were 96.3 males. For every 100 females age 18 and over, there were 94.1 males.

The median income for a household in the township was $59,835, and the median income for a family was $67,239. Males had a median income of $50,754 versus $31,165 for females. The per capita income for the township was $24,131. About 2.7% of families and 4.5% of the population were below the poverty line, including 4.8% of those under age 18 and 5.0% of those age 65 or over.

Education
Bedford Township and a few surrounding areas are serviced by Bedford Public Schools, which includes Douglas Road, Jackman Road, and Monroe Road Elementary Schools, Bedford Junior High School, and Bedford Senior High School. Between 2010 and 2012, facing budget constraints and a declining enrollment, the school board decided to close Smith Road Elementary and Temperance Road Elementary. Students from both schools were absorbed into the remaining elementary schools. New Bedford Academy is a charter school serving students K-8. It is chartered by Ferris State University. 

Also, Spring Arbor University operates a location geared for adults in Lambertville, and Monroe County Community College operates a branch of its college in Bedford Township named the Whitman Center.

Previously St. Anthony School of the Roman Catholic Archdiocese of Detroit was in Temperance. Its service area included Bedford Township.

Media
Bedford Township contains two local newspapers: Bedford Now and the Bedford Press. In addition, the nearby Toledo Blade daily newspaper covers Bedford Township and the surrounding community. Radio stations within the township include WMLZ-LP and WMLZ-LP.

Notable people 

 Mat Kerekes (b. 1994) is an American singer and songwriter who was raised in Bedford Township, although he was born in neighboring Toledo. He is also lead singer of the rock band Citizen. Kerekes references Bedford Township in the song "20**" on his 2020 solo album, Amber.

References

External links
 Bedford Township official website

Townships in Monroe County, Michigan
Townships in Michigan
Populated places established in 1836
1836 establishments in Michigan Territory